Carol Collier Kuhlthau (born December 2, 1937) is a retired American educator, researcher, and international speaker on learning in school libraries, information literacy, and information seeking behavior.

Biography 
She was born in New Brunswick, New Jersey, U.S., Kuhlthau graduated from Kean University in 1959, completing a master's degree in Librarianship in 1974 at Rutgers University, and a doctorate in Education in 1983.  She was on the faculty of the Rutgers University Department Library and Information Science for more than 20 years and Professor Emeritus since 2006.

Kuhlthau was the founder of the Center for International Scholarship in School Libraries.

Research
Introduced in 1991, Kuhlthau's model of the Information Search Process (ISP) describes feelings, thoughts and actions in six stages of information seeking. The model of the ISP introduced the holistic experience of information seeking from the individual’s perspective, stressed the important role of affect in information seeking and proposed an uncertainty principle as a conceptual framework for library and information service. Kuhlthau’s work is among the most highly cited of library and information science faculty and one of the conceptualizations most often used by information science researchers.  The ISP model represents a watershed in the development of new strategies for the delivery of K-16 library and information skills.

Education
Kuhlthau received her B.S. from Kean University in 1959, Master's in Library Science (MLS) from Rutgers University in 1974 and her Doctorate in Education in 1983, also from Rutgers University. Her doctoral dissertation was titled "The Library Research Process: Case Studies and Interventions with High School Seniors in Advanced Placement English Classes Using Kelly's Theory of Constructs." She held several teaching and library positions before joining the Rutgers faculty in 1985 where for twenty years she directed the school library specialization in the Masters in Library and Information Science degree program that is ranked first in the United States by U.S. News & World Report.  During her tenure at Rutgers she was promoted to Professor II and chaired the Library and Information Science Department and retired as Professor Emerita in 2006.  She was the founding Director of the Center for International Scholarship in School Libraries (CISSL) at Rutgers where she continues as senior advisor.  Her book Seeking Meaning: A Process Approach to Library and Information Services is a classic text in library and information science in the United States and abroad.  Guided Inquiry: Learning in the 21st Century (2007) 2nd Ed (2015), written with Leslie Maniotes and Ann Caspari, recommends learning environments where students gain deep understanding and also information literacy grounded in the Information Search Process. Guided Inquiry Design: A Framework for Inquiry in Your School (2012) written with Leslie Maniotes, PhD and Ann Caspari is a full description of the instructional design framework called Guided Inquiry Design a complete approach to inquiry based learning from a learning perspective.

Selected writings
 "Guided Inquiry Design: A Framework for Inquiry in Your School with Leslie Maniotes and Ann Caspari (2012)
 Guided Inquiry: Learning in the 21st Century with Leslie Maniotes and Ann Caspari (2007) revised second edition (2015)
 Seeking Meaning: A Process Approach to Library and Information Services (2004)
 Teaching the Library Research Process (1994, 2004)
 “Inside the Search Process: Information Seeking from the User’s Perspective”, Journal of the American Society for Information Science (1991)

Awards
 American Society for Information Science and Technology (ASIST) Research in Information Science Award, 2005
 Association for Library and Information Science Education (ALISE) Award for Professional Contribution Library and Information Science Education, 2004
 Library and Information Technology Association (LITA) Frederick G. Kilgour Research Award, 2002
 Association of College and Research Libraries (ACRL) Miriam Dudley Instruction Librarian Award, 2000
 American Library Association (ALA) Jesse Shera Award for Research, 1998
 American Association of School Librarians (AASL) Distinguished Service Award, 2000
 Association for Educational Communications and Technology (AECT) Award for Outstanding Contributions to the School Library Media Field through Publishing, and Teaching

See also
 Information Search Process

References

External links
 Guided Inquiry, Strategies for Teaching in the 21st Century, (IASL 2009 keynote presentation)
 Kuhlthau's Model of the Stages of the Information Process, reproduced from Seeking Meaning: A Process Approach to Library and Information Services, retrieved December 3, 2006

American educators
Living people
1937 births
Kean University alumni
Rutgers University alumni